The Clermont-Ferrand International Short Film Festival  (French: Festival international du court métrage de Clermont-Ferrand) is an international film festival dedicated to short films held annually in Clermont-Ferrand, France.

History 
In 1979, a Short Film Week was organised by the Clermont-Ferrand University Film Society.  In 1982, the Festival became competitive, with a jury attributing awards to films selected from the recent French short film production. International films were shown in special programs highlighting a particular theme, genre, country or region of the world. The audience was also presented with tributes to the great short film makers of the past and present.

In 1986, the first Clermont-Ferrand Short Film Market was organized, with the intention to raise the economic profile of the short films. The market contains a video library for French and foreign television buyers, distributors and festival programmers to view the all of the films in competition, as well as the films out of competition, that were submitted for consideration.

The Festival 
Clermont has been the biggest short film festival for 40 years, the essential meeting place for spectators, professionals, youngsters and school children. Audiences has a choice of 600 films, across all sections, and the three competitions (national, international and Lab). 
The programming team receives each year more than 7000 short films submissions between March and October, included 1500 French productions.

Discoveries
The festival has revealed many directors who then launched their film career successfully, for example:
 Cédric Klapisch, winner of the Special Jury Prize in 1987 for In Transit (his graduation film ), then again the Special Jury Prize in 1990 for I am moving
 Jean-Pierre Jeunet, winner of the Audience Award and Press Award in 1990 for Bullshit
 Jan Kounen, Prize winning research in 1994 for Vibroboy
 Erick Zonca, Grand Prix in 1995 for Eternal
 Shawn Christensen, winner of the 2012 International Audience Award for Curfew, went on to win the Oscar for Best Live Action Short Film at the 85th Academy Awards
 The short film Logorama which won the Oscar for best short film at the 82nd Academy Awards

References

External links 
 

Film festivals in France
Clermont-Ferrand
Short film festivals